Springtime for Henry is a 1934 American comedy film directed by Frank Tuttle and starring Otto Kruger, Nancy Carroll and Nigel Bruce. It was based on a play of the same name by the British writer Benn W. Levy which enjoyed an eight-month run on Broadway. The film was made on a budget of $250,000 and suffered a considerable loss, taking only $126,000 at the box office.

Plot

Henry Dewlip is the heir to his late father's prosperous automobile plant. He lets underlings run things while he indulges in wine, women and song, stringing women along. Julia Jelliwell is the latest woman to have the key to his apartment but there are problems, like her jealous husband, Johnny. Also the strait-laced Miss Smith, his latest secretary who secretly harbours a crush on him. She manages to spoil things with Julia and then to try to get him to take an interest in his car plant, spoiling a chance for Johnny to sell him a carburetor.

Things fall flat when Henry finds that not only was Miss Smith previously married but she has a baby. This upsets Henry and the butler takes the chance to reinstate the old system that worked so well, so he calls Julia. At a mission for reforming souls, a fight ensues and both Henry and Julia end up in cells. Finally released, he now has a cold.

Later he dictates to Miss Smith in a sharp voice and she says that her husband is dead. She shot him a year previously in Paris. Henry quickly falls out of love with her and goes back to Julia. Henry takes Johnny's carburetor business into his motor business and takes up with Julia. Meanwhile, Johnny has been smitten by Miss Smith.

Cast
 Otto Kruger as Henry Dewlip
 Nancy Carroll as Julia Jelliwell
 Nigel Bruce as Johnny Jelliwell
 Heather Angel as Miss Smith
 Herbert Mundin as Trivers
 Arthur Hoyt as Alfred Ordway
 Geneva Mitchell as Young Lady

References

Bibliography
 Solomon, Aubrey. The Fox Film Corporation, 1915-1935: A History and Filmography. McFarland, 2011.

External links

1934 films
1934 comedy films
American comedy films
1930s English-language films
Films directed by Frank Tuttle
American films based on plays
American black-and-white films
Fox Film films
1930s American films